Palazzia is a genus of sea snails, marine gastropod mollusks, unassigned in the superfamily Seguenzioidea.

Species
Species within the genus Palazzia include:
 Palazzia ausonia (Palazzi, 1988)
 Palazzia nautiliformis (Powell, 1927)
 Palazzia pankakare Absalao, 2009
 Palazzia planorbis (Dall, 1927)
 Palazzia ramosa (Powell, 1940)

References

 Gofas, S.; Le Renard, J.; Bouchet, P. (2001). Mollusca, in: Costello, M.J. et al. (Ed.) (2001). European register of marine species: a check-list of the marine species in Europe and a bibliography of guides to their identification. Collection Patrimoines Naturels, 50: pp. 180–213
 Spencer, H.; Marshall. B. (2009). All Mollusca except Opisthobranchia. In: Gordon, D. (Ed.) (2009). New Zealand Inventory of Biodiversity. Volume One: Kingdom Animalia. 584 pp
 Kano Y., Chikyu, E. & Warén, A. (2009) Morphological, ecological and molecular characterization of the enigmatic planispiral snail genus Adeuomphalus (Vetigastropoda: Seguenzioidea). Journal of Molluscan Studies, 75:397-418.